Deserticossus mongoliana is a moth in the family Cossidae. It was described by Franz Daniel in 1969. It is found in Mongolia. The habitat consists of deserts, where it is found at altitudes ranging from 900 to 1,600 meters.

The length of the forewings is 12–18 mm for males and 17–22 mm for females. The forewings are light brown with transversal streaks and a row of dark-brown strokes along the costal margin, as well as brown strokes along the veins at the outer margin. The hindwings are brown, but light yellow at the base. Adults are on wing from June to July.

References

Cossinae
Moths described in 1969
Moths of Asia